Høvik Church is a cruciform church  in Bærum in Viken county, Norway. The building is in brick and has 500 seats.

History
The church was consecrated on March 31, 1898.
The building of the church started in 1895, after drawings by Norwegian architect Henrik Nissen (1848–1915). The church is made of red brick, with some details in glazed black brick and lime-plastered surfaces. The church is done in a lively English-inspired Neo-Gothic style, and forms a distinctly asymmetrical motif at Drammensveien by the European route E18.

The interior of the church is richly decorated with stained glass, created by various artists for different periods of time. On the walls hang paintings, painted by different artists.  The altarpiece is made in Neo Gothic style and the materials wood and brass are used to create a crucifix.  The church organ from 1922 has 25 voices, created by organ builder J. H. Jørgensen.

The church is listed by the Norwegian Directorate for Cultural Heritage.

References

External links 
 Official parish website 

Churches in Viken
Churches completed in 1898
1898 establishments in Norway
19th-century Church of Norway church buildings